Ctrl Emotion  is a Czech comedy film. It was released in 2009.

External links 
 

2009 films
Czech comedy films
2000s Czech-language films
2009 comedy films
2000s Czech films